Léon Théry (16 April 1879 – 8 March 1909) was a French racing driver, nicknamed "Le Chronometer", who won the premier European race, the Gordon Bennett Cup, in both 1904 and 1905.

Career
Théry started out as a mechanic which gave him an understanding of the need to drive according to the car's abilities, and nurse it home to victory. His nickname was "Le Chronometer", for his reliable lap times, and he became one of the top drivers in the early 1900s.

He competed respectably up until 1903, driving a Decauvillle, and became a voiturette champion. He is regarded as winning 'one of the first Voiturette races, if not the very first'.

1899

His first race was the Paris to Amsterdam in 1898 at the wheel of a voiturette.

1899

His competed was the Paris-Bordeaux city to city race in 1899. Nevertheless, this was enough for second place, behind the Decauville of Gabriel, and ahead of a second teammate.

1901

In 1901, Théry drove a Decauville voiturelle in the Paris-Rouen-Paris race on 11/03/1900, winning the Coupe des Voiturettes (voiturette class).

Théry became renowned for his methodical documentation in a 'race log' of circuit details, road conditions, tyres, engine reliability, and car performance. He then drove scrupulously to the speed he had calculated in the race log.

1902

1902 was a year of trauma. He entered his Decauville in the Paris-Vienna race on 26–29 June, accompanied by his mechanic Muller. Brake failure on the Arlberg pass (1,793 m (5,883 ft)) in Austria tested all his skills in avoiding disaster. In the Ardennes Cup race on 31 July, they hit a cow at full speed.

1903

In 1903, Théry joined the French manufacturer Richard-Brasier.

1904

On 20 May 1904, Théry won the Gordon Bennett Elimination Trial at Argonne, France,  driving an  Richard-Brasier.

On 17 June 1904, he won the Gordon Bennett Cup at Homburg in the Taunus mountains of Germany. The event drew entries from eight countries and was considered the single most important race in Europe. Théry's Richard-Brasier 80 hp triumphed over Camille Jenatzy's Mercedes.

Théry's victory meant instant fame such that when he and Henri Brasier arrived in Paris they received an enthusiastic reception at the ACF premises, appearing on the balcony to acknowledge thousands of cheering Parisians. A series of banquets and festivities followed, whence - during one of them - Fernand Charron announced the subscription he had started had raised 12,200 FF. Théry was awarded the interest of a lifetime bond, and another subscription was opened for the three mechanics that had accompanied him, including Muller his riding mechanic. Brasier presented Théry with the winning car that he took to America, earning a big purse, but little racing success.

1905

The 1905 Gordon Bennett Cup, as agreed by its rules, was held in France, the home country of its previous winner.

On 16 June 1905, Théry won the Gordon Bennett Elimination Trial in the Auvergne, France, driving a  Richard-Brasier.

On 5 July, 	Théry and his riding mechanic Mueller won their second Gordon Bennett Cup, driving an eleven-litre 96Hp Richard-Brasier over 4 laps (548 km) of a circuit in the Auvergne mountains of France. Théry and Charles-Henri Brasier received a hero's welcome on the streets of Paris, before being received in the Elysée Palace by the President of France, Émile Loubet.

1906 onwards

Although his success in the 1904 and 1905 Gordon Bennett Cup events had contributed to the Automobile Club de France (ACF) organising the 1906 Grand Prix de l'Automobile Club de France, he did not enter the 1906 or 1907 French Grand Prix. He tried to build his own racing car, a financial enterprise that failed completely, and forced him to work as chauffeur for the La Vie au Grand Air reporter at the 'Bordeaux-Paris' bicycle race in May 1908.

In 1908 he returned to driving for Brasier and entered the Grand Prix of France, but he retired on the last lap of the 10 lap race with a collapsed wheel. He was running fourth overall and first of the French cars. This was the last race of his career.

Michelin

Théry worked for Michelin. Some sources report him as responsible for naming Bibendum, the Michelin Man.  The rubber-man had been popular with the French public since  the Michelin brothers introduced it at Lyon in 1894, and had acquired a variety of nicknames. At the 1898 Paris–Amsterdam–Paris race, Léon greeted André Michelin with a shout, "Here comes Bibendum!". Michelin immediately adopted the name (Latin for "time to drink") to show his tyres could 'drink' spikes, nails, glass, etc.

Death and commemoration
Théry died of tuberculosis at the age of 29. His tomb is in the Père Lachaise Cemetery in Paris.

In 2005, the hundredth anniversary of Théry's Gordon Bennett victory in France, many events were organized. The Post Office issued a stamp and the Paris Mint struck a commemorative medal representing Théry driving his Brasier.

References

Background sources
Wise, David Burgess."Decauville: Road-going Rolling Stock", in Ward, Ian, executive editor. World of Automobiles, Volume 5, p. 506. London: Orbis, 1974.
 Autosport.com, The Nostalgia Forum, - Leon Thery - When? 11/03/1900; Coupe des Voiturettes 
 Autosport.com, The Nostalgia Forum, - Leon Thery - 1900 Paris-Rouen-Paris
 Autosport.com, The Nostalgia Forum, - Leon Thery - Heroic Age drivers - Thery and Velghe

External links
 The Richard-Brasier car driven by Leon Thery during the Gordon Bennett race in the Auvergne in 1905. Painted by Ernest Montaut
 Gallery of Léon Théry images

French racing drivers
Grand Prix drivers
1909 deaths
1879 births
Burials at Père Lachaise Cemetery
20th-century deaths from tuberculosis
Tuberculosis deaths in France